1:24 scale is a size for automobile models such as injection-molded plastic model kits or metal die-cast toys, which are built and collected by both children and adults. 1:24 means that a unit of measurement, such as one inch or one centimeter, on the model represents 24 units on the actual object. An example would be one inch of length on a model automobile would represent 24 inches on the real vehicle. Primarily automobile models are made in this scale, with a few examples of tractor trailers and other larger equipment. In the United States there is a very minor variation of the 1:24 scale, where many automobile plastic model kits are scaled at 1:25.

1:24 is the largest of the traditional slot car sizes - and the earliest. Lionel's (USA) 1:24 electric autos of 1912-1916 became the first known commercial slot cars. In 1955, the Model Automobile Racing Association of Kalamazoo, Michigan, built the first track for electric rail-racing (the short-lived immediate predecessor to slot racing) in the US. Unlike the seminal Southport (UK) track that inspired it, the MARA table was designed for 1:24 as well as 1:32 competition. With that beginning, the US adopted 1:24 as the primary scale for serious competition during the heyday of slot car racing in the 1960s, while Britain and Europe favored 1:32, and have continued to do so.

1:24 scale is very close to the scale (1:22.5) used for European G scale narrow-gauge model trains, so 1:24 models are often used on model train layouts. Doll houses and furniture are also found in 1:24 scale.

The British plastic model kit company Airfix have produced a number of  1:24 scale aircraft in its 'Super Kit' range, including the Supermarine Spitfire, Messerschmitt Bf 109 - both initially with the option of motorised propellers, Junkers Ju 87 Stuka, Hawker Siddeley Harrier, and Focke-Wulf Fw 190. The latest to be released are the de Havilland Mosquito and the Hawker Typhoon. An earlier release was a 1:24 scale model of the Wallis WA-116 "Little Nellie" autogyro as portrayed in the 1967 James Bond film, You Only Live Twice.

List of manufacturers 
Airfix (plastic model kits)
AUTOart (slot cars)
Bburago (die-cast models)
Emergency Heroes (toys)
Jada Toys (die-cast models)
Leo (high detail die-cast models)
Maisto (die-cast models)

See also
 Gauge 1
List of scale model sizes
Scale model
Slot car scales
 G Scale
Rail transport modelling scales

References

Scale model scales
Toy cars and trucks